Morad Beygi (also Romanized as Morād Beygī; also known as Morad Bagi, Morād Begī, and Murād Bogli) is a village in Howmeh-ye Gharbi Rural District, in the Central District of Ramhormoz County, Khuzestan Province, Iran. At the 2006 census, its population was 154, in 31 families.

References 

Populated places in Ramhormoz County